Nikita Sergeyevich Glushkov (born 19 March 1999) is a Russian football player. He plays for FC Dynamo Makhachkala.

Club career
He made his debut in the Russian Professional Football League for FC Kazanka Moscow on 18 July 2018 in a game against FC Leningradets Leningrad Oblast.

He made his Russian Football National League debut for FC Chayka Peschanokopskoye on 13 July 2019 in a game against FC Fakel Voronezh.

References

External links
 

1999 births
Living people
Russian footballers
Association football midfielders
Russia youth international footballers
FC Lokomotiv Moscow players
FC Chayka Peschanokopskoye players
FC Dynamo Makhachkala players
Russian First League players
Russian Second League players